The foot sweep (also footsweep) is a move in many different styles of martial arts. It is used to trip an opponent. Foot sweeps are commonly used in Tang Soo Do, karate, Muay Thai and jujutsu. In addition, many closer sweeps like the Trap Sweep and Two-Leg Sweep can resemble Judo throws.

Types

Drop sweep
Commonly thought of when someone hears “foot sweep,” the drop sweep involves spinning and sweeping one or two legs from a crouched position. This move is also known as the front sweep in martial arts circles.

Single-leg sweep 
When the opponent has one foot off the ground (usually in mid-kick) and the defender moves past this kick and sweeps out the standing leg.

Trap sweep 
A variant of the single-leg sweep, this involves catching the opponent's kick with one hand and sweeping the back leg. The advantage is closer proximity and less chance of failure, but it leaves the defender open to hand attacks to the head.

Two-leg sweep
When the opponent has both feet on the ground and the defender strikes behind both legs, usually accompanied by a blow across the chest to further off-balance the opponent.

Forward sweep
A sweep aimed at the front of the opponent's legs, as opposed to the more conventional behind-the-legs strike. This is considered more dangerous due to the possibility of injuring the opponent's knees or shins if the sweep is too powerful or misapplied.

Scissor sweep
The scissor sweep involves positioning one leg across the opponent's lower chest/stomach and striking behind the knee or calves with the other leg, closing the legs in a “scissor” motion. This can be done as an offensive technique, leaping into the air toward the opponent, but is more commonly used as an escape when the opponent has trapped the defender's kick across his chest.

Reverse scissor sweep
A variant of the scissor sweep, it is an offensive technique used in opposite position from a traditional scissor; that is, the higher leg strikes at the opponent's back and the lower leg scissors against the front of the opponent's knees. Like the forward sweep, this can be very dangerous due to potential injury to the opponent's knees, spine, and kidneys.

See also
Sweep (martial arts)

References

External links
Fundamentals of High Performance Wushu: Taolu Jumps and Spins by Raymond Wu, . 
(Wayback Machine copy)

Kicks
Martial art techniques